"Ya Got Trouble" is a song by Meredith Willson from the 1957 Broadway musical The Music Man, and its 1962 filmed version. It is one of the most popular and recognizable songs in the musical, and Robert Preston's performance in the film is admired. Willson considered eliminating a long piece of dialogue from his draft of The Music Man about the serious trouble facing River City parents. Willson realized it sounded like a lyric and transformed it into "Ya Got Trouble".

Content
A smooth-talking, yet corrupt, traveling salesman takes up the occupation of a musical-instrument dealer and tries to convince the citizens of River City, Iowa, to fund his idea for a boys' marching band by playing on their fears of youth corruption, represented by a new pocket pool table in the local billiard hall. The song is his slippery slope argument of what could happen should the citizens fail to recognize the danger and not follow his suggestion for a more wholesome activity. The song contains many types of invalid argumentation ("trouble starts with t, which rhymes with p, which stands for pool").

Title variations
The song is sometimes listed as "(Ya Got) Trouble". The original Broadway cast album lists the song title as "Trouble", both on the record jacket and label. "You Got Trouble" is a common misspelling of the song title.

Notable covers and parodies

A fully arranged cover of the song appears on the 1967 eponymous debut album of the sunshine pop band Spanky and Our Gang.

A bar of the song's main chorus is featured in a mid-1970s episode of the children's TV series The Electric Company. The song was part of a skit featuring an irritable police commissioner (Jim Boyd) and several of his inept recruits (Morgan Freeman, Luis Avalos and Skip Hinnant).

American humorist, satirist, and advertising innovator Stan Freberg covered the song for Capitol Records in 1958. Though Freberg often directly parodied songs (or "kidded" them, in his phrase), his recording of "Ya Got Trouble" was a straightforward recording of the song, arranged and conducted by his longtime collaborator Billy May. Freberg wrote that the subtle parody in the recording lay in the fact that it was recorded in an empty concert hall, as were many Broadway soundtrack albums, with the characteristic echo of such large empty space. Also, during the 2010 Writers Guild Awards, Seth MacFarlane, creator of Family Guy, did a parody of the song entitled "Ya Got Trouble" but it was about unscripted shows. MacFarlane also sang the song in his second BBC Proms appearance with The John Wilson Orchestra, "Prom 59: The Broadway Sound", on August 27, 2012.

In an episode of the 1980s TV series Fame, Morgan Stevens, in character as David Reardon, performed the selection with the assistance of some of the regular cast.

In Ally McBeal Season 2 episode "Sex, Lies and Politics" fictional lawyer John Cage spurs the jury into singing "Ya Got Trouble" with him.

In an episode of the TV series The Simpsons titled "Marge vs. the Monorail", a fast-talking salesman named Lyle Lanley convinces the townspeople to buy a city monorail with "The Monorail Song", a parody of this song.

"The Bible, Part 3", an early version of the song "All-American Prophet" from The Book of Mormon was modeled stylistically after "Ya Got Trouble", and ended with the same line: "Remember my friends, listen to me because I pass this way but once!"

When hosting the 58th Primetime Emmy Awards, Conan O'Brien sang a parody of the song about how NBC's ratings were starting to slip at the time.

In a 2016 episode of Crazy Ex-Girlfriend, "Josh and I Work on a Case," the eponymous character Rebecca cajoles the tenants of an apartment complex to sue their landlord in a parody of this song entitled "Cold Showers Lead to Crack".

My Little Pony: Friendship Is Magic featured the song 'Super Speedy Cider Squeezy 6000' from the second season episode of the same name. The song was inspired by "Ya Got Trouble" while the whole episode is loosely based on The Music Man, both the 1962 film and the 1957 musical.

In an episode of Schmigadoon! titled "Tribulation", Mildred Layton (played by Kristin Chenoweth, and based on Music Man's, Mrs. Shinn) attempts to condemn the outsiders and tries to convince the townspeople to vote her for Mayor with "Tribulation", a direct parody of this song.

See also
Knickerbockers - a type of mid-length pants once worn by young men
Dan Patch – the horse mentioned in the lyrics
Bevo – near beer mentioned in the lyrics
Cubebs – non-tobacco cigarettes
Tailor-mades – factory-made tobacco cigarettes
Sen-Sen – breath freshener, used to cover up the smell of alcoholic beverages
Captain Billy's Whiz Bang – bawdy humor magazine

References

Bibliography
The American Musical and the Formation of National Identity, Raymond Knapp. Princeton University Press, 2005

1957 songs
Patter songs
Hugh Jackman songs
Songs from The Music Man
Songs written by Meredith Willson